The Charles E. Blair House is a late Victorian-style house in Laramie, Wyoming. Built in 1911 it represents a late, austere version of Victorian architecture, using a yellowish "blond" brick that became available after 1900 in Wyoming. The plan is rectangular with two projecting bays crowned by deep gables above the second floor. A broad porch fronts the house. An entry hall in the left front corner contains the stairs. Rooms are mainly  accessed from each other.

The Blair House was placed on the National Register of Historic Places on October 31, 1980.

References

External links
 Charles E. Blair House at the Wyoming State Historic Preservation Office

National Register of Historic Places in Albany County, Wyoming
Victorian architecture in Wyoming
Houses completed in 1911